West Yellowhead is a provincial electoral district in Alberta, Canada. The district is one of 87 current ridings mandated to return a single member to the Legislative Assembly of Alberta using the first past the post method of voting.

The district in its early history was a swing riding, changing party hands often. More recently, support has gone to electing candidates from the Progressive Conservatives, who have held the district with sizable majorities since 1997. The current representative is UCP Martin Long who was first elected in the 2019 provincial election.

Geography
West Yellowhead is a predominantly rural riding located in northwest and west-central Alberta. The landscape includes the Rocky Mountains of Jasper National Park, their foothills, and large expanses of boreal forest, some of which has been cleared for agriculture.

There are no cities in the riding. The only urban municipalities within its boundaries are three large towns: Edson, Hinton, and Whitecourt. Other population centres include Jasper, incorporated as a specialized municipality, and Grande Cache, a former town that became a hamlet in 2019.

West Yellowhead also includes the entirety of three rural municipalities (Improvement District No. 12, Improvement District No. 25, and Yellowhead County) and parts of two others (the Municipal District of Greenview No. 16 and Woodlands County).

No First Nation band governments are based in the riding. However, the riding does includes three reserves (Alexis Cardinal River Indian Reserve 234, Alexis Elk River Indian Reserve 233, and Alexis Whitecourt Indian Reserve 232) that are associated with the Alexis Nakota Sioux Nation, a signatory of Treaty 6. The unrecognized Aseniwuche Winewak Nation also has several settlements in the riding, in the Grande Cache area.

West Yellowhead borders seven other electoral districts: Grande Prairie-Wapiti and Central Peace-Notley to the north, Athabasca-Barrhead-Westlock to the northeast, Lac Ste. Anne-Parkland and Drayton Valley-Devon to the east, and Rimbey-Rocky Mountain House-Sundre and Banff-Kananaskis to the south. The riding's western boundary is the Alberta-British Columbia border.

History
The district was created in the 1986 boundary redistribution from most of the old Edson electoral district. Since it was created, the district has remained almost unchanged. The 2010 boundary redistribution did not change the riding from 2003.

Boundary history

Electoral history
The electoral district was created in the 1986 general election. The first election held that year saw a tight race between incumbent Progressive Conservative MLA Ian Reid who had previously represented the Edson electoral district and New Democrat candidate Phil Oakes. Reid barely hung onto win to pick up the new district for his party.

The 1989 election would see Reid defeated by New Democrat candidate Jerry Doyle in another close race. Doyle would only last a single term in office as he was defeated by Liberal candidate Duco Van Binsbergen in the 1993 general election.

The Progressive Conservatives would regain the seat in the 1997 general election as candidate Ivan Strang defeated Van Binsbergen. Strang was re-elected in the 2001 election with a solid majority. He won a third term in the 2004 general election taking less than half the popular vote but winning a comfortable plurality over the opposition candidates which polled an evenly dived vote. He would retire from office in 2008.

Progressive Conservative Robin Campbell was elected in 2008 and re-elected in 2012.  Campbell lost to Eric Rosendahl of the New Democratic Party when the NDP were voted into government on May 4, 2015.

Legislature results

1986 general election

1989 general election

1993 general election

1997 general election

2001 general election

2004 general election

2008 general election

2012 general election

2015 general election

2019 general election

Senate nominee results

2004 Senate nominee election district results

Voters had the option of selecting 4 Candidates on the Ballot

2012 Senate nominee election district results

Student Vote results

2004 election

On November 19, 2004, a Student Vote was conducted at participating Alberta schools to parallel the 2004 Alberta general election results. The vote was designed to educate students and simulate the electoral process for persons who have not yet reached the legal majority. The vote was conducted in 80 of the 83 provincial electoral districts with students voting for actual election candidates. Schools with a large student body that reside in another electoral district had the option to vote for candidates outside of the electoral district then where they were physically located.

2012 election

References

External links 
Website of the Legislative Assembly of Alberta

Alberta provincial electoral districts
Edson, Alberta
Hinton, Alberta